Project: Driver is a studio album by the heavy metal supergroup M.A.R.S., released in 1986 through Shrapnel Records (United States) and Roadrunner Records (Europe). The band's name is made up of the initial of each musician's last name: guitarist Tony MacAlpine, drummer Tommy Aldridge, singer Rob Rock, and bassist Rudy Sarzo. Craig Goldy was their original guitarist, but he left after joining Dio.

Critical reception

In a very positive contemporary review, Rock Hard called the album "exemplary" and associated the music to Yngwie Malmsteen's 1984 album Rising Force, "not only because of the breathtaking solos of Tony MacAlpine, but also because of some songwriting parallels", offering "a colorful bouquet of musical diversity" with "something for everyone."

Modern reviews are less positive. Andy Hinds at AllMusic wrote that "while it masquerades as a Whitesnake-styled group effort, Project: Driver seems like another MacAlpine album with vocals added." Rob Rock was criticized as embodying "all the big-hair clichés of '80s heavy metal", while songs such as "Slave to My Touch", "Stand Up and Fight" and "Fantasy" were labeled "cheesy" and "cringe-inducing." Praise was given to MacAlpine's guitar playing, which Hinds described as "dizzying" and interesting. Canadian journalist Martin Popoff defined the project as "one of those doomed and hasty assemblages of rock journeymen utterly without synergy" and called the music "unbranded ear-splitting speed metal".

Track listing

Personnel
M.A.R.S.
Rob Rock – lead vocals, background vocals
Tony MacAlpine – guitar, keyboards, background vocals
Rudy Sarzo – bass, background vocals
Tommy Aldridge – drums, background vocals

Additional musicians
Mike Mani – keyboard programming
Bret Douglas, Tommy Cosgrove, Mark Tate, Dino Alden, Mike Varney – background vocals

Production
Mike Varney – producer
Steve Fontano – engineer
Dino Alden, Randy Vance – assistant engineers
George Horn – mastering at Fantasy Studios, Berkeley, California

References

External links
In Review: MacAlpine/Aldridge/Rock/Sarzo "Project: Driver" at Guitar Nine Records

Tony MacAlpine albums
Rob Rock albums
1986 albums
Shrapnel Records albums
Albums produced by Mike Varney